Friedrich Wilhelm Grund (7 October 1791, Hamburg – 24 November 1874, Hamburg) was a German composer, conductor and teacher.

He studied with his father (piano, violin, cello and contrabass) and with the Hamburg cantor Christian Friedrich Gottlieb Schwencke. In 1819, he abandoned his career as a concert virtuoso because of the nerve disease of his right hand and he started to compose and teach. In the same year, he co-founded and led the Gesellschaft der Freunde des religiösen Gesangs (later the Hamburger Singakademie). He also co-founded the Hamburger Tonkünstlervereins.

List of selected works
 Op. 5 Piano quartet
 Op. 8 Quintet for piano and winds
 Op. 9 Violin sonata
 Op. 11 Sonata for piano and cello or violin
 Op. 13 Grande sonate
 Op. 13 Piano quartet
 Op. 14 Grande polonaise
 Op. 22 Songs
 Op. 23 Grand divertissement
 Op. 25 Introduction et rondeau
 Op. 27 Trio de salon
 Op. 31 Songs for two voices
 Die Burg Falkenstein (romantic opera in 5 acts, Hamburg, 1825)
 Mathilde (heroic opera in 3 acts)
 Caroline Pichler (opera, not performed)
 Die Auferstehung und Himmelfahrt Jesu (oratorio)
 6 songs after Goethe

References
 Biography at operone.de
 List of works by F. W. Grund

External links
 Texts and translations of vocal works at the LiederNet Archive
 

1791 births
1874 deaths
Musicians from Hamburg
German conductors (music)
German male conductors (music)
German Romantic composers
19th-century classical composers
German male classical composers
19th-century German composers
19th-century German male musicians